Let the Truth Be Known is the debut album by hard rock supergroup Souls of We released on May 27, 2008 via the group's official website with the first 1000 copies, with blues musician Robert Johnson inspired album artwork, signed by members London LeGrand and George Lynch. The album was later released on November 4 of the same year, through Shrapnel Records, under the moniker "George Lynch's Souls of We" with new album artwork, a rearranged track listing as well the additional track "Nork 13". The album was self-produced in various studios around Los Angeles and mixed by Mudrock, who has work with bands such as Avenged Sevenfold and Godsmack.

The album features guest appearances by Andrew Freeman of Lynch Mob, Jeff Pilson of Dokken and Dio, Frédéric Leclercq of DragonForce, Patrick Johansson of Yngwie Malmsteen, Bobby Jarzombek of Riot and Halford, session drummer Mike Hansen and Morgan Rose of Sevendust.

On October 26, 2009 a video was released for album track called 'Skeleton Key'.

Track listing

Original
All songs written by George Lynch and London LeGrand

Re-release

Personnel

Souls of We
London LeGrand – vocals
George Lynch –  guitar
Johny Chow – bass
Ya'el – drums

Additional personnel
Andrew Freeman – additional vocals
Jeff Pilson – additional bass
Frédéric Leclercq – additional bass
Patrick Johansson – additional drums
Bobby Jarzombek – additional drums
Morgan Rose – additional drums
Mike Hansen – additional drums
Alex Solca – album photography
Ravi Dosaj – album design and layout

Production personnel
George Lynch – producer
London LeGrand – producer
Mike Tacci – engineer
Brett Chasson – engineer
Yuri Nation – engineer
Rob Tarango – engineer
Mudrock – mixing
Dave Schultz – mastering

References

2008 debut albums
Souls of We albums